The Son of Wallingford is a 1921 American silent comedy drama film directed by George Randolph Chester and Lillian Josephine Chester and starring Wilfrid North, Tom Gallery and Antrim Short. It is based on George Chester's novel  The Son of Wallingford about a confidence trickster, itself inspired by his Cosmopolitan articles and an earlier hit play Get-Rich-Quick Wallingford. It was shot at Vitagraph's Flatbush Studios in Brooklyn. It was released by Vitagraph a couple of months before a Paramount Pictures version of Get-Rich-Quick Wallingford.

Cast
 Wilfrid North as J. Rufus Wallingford
 Tom Gallery as 	Jimmy Wallkingford
 George Webb as Blackie Daw
 Antrim Short as 'Toad' Edward Jessup
 Van Dyke Brooke as Henry Beegoode
 Sidney D'Albrook as Bertram Beegoode
 Andrew Arbuckle as Talbot Curtis
 Bobbie Mack as O.O. Jones 
 Walter Rodgers as 'Petrograd' Pete
 Priscilla Bonner as Mary Curtis
 Florence Hart as Mrs. Fannie Wallingford
 Lila Leslie as Bonnie Daw
 Margaret Cullington as Coline Beegoode

References

Bibliography
 Connelly, Robert B. The Silents: Silent Feature Films, 1910-36, Volume 40, Issue 2. December Press, 1998.
 Munden, Kenneth White. The American Film Institute Catalog of Motion Pictures Produced in the United States, Part 1. University of California Press, 1997.

External links
 

1921 films
1921 comedy films
American silent feature films
American black-and-white films
Vitagraph Studios films
1920s English-language films
1920s American films
Silent American comedy films